Mytton may refer to:

People
Adam Mytton (1498–1561), English MP
Alex Mytton, cast member of television series Made in Chelsea
Devereaux Mytton (1924–1989), Australian competitive sailor and Olympic medalist
John Mytton (1796–1834), British eccentric and Regency rake
Richard Mytton (1501–1591), English politician
Sarah Mytton Maury (1801–1839), English-American author
Thomas Mytton (died ?1563), English politician
Thomas Mytton (1597–1656), English Parliamentarian general of the English Civil War

Other uses
Mytton, Shropshire, England
Mytton and Mermaid Hotel, a Grade II listed building in Atcham, England